The Schempp-Hirth HS-3 Nimbus was a prototype glider built by Klaus Holighaus.

The HS-3 Nimbus was a high performance single-seater. Holighaus designed and built this prototype glider in his spare time with assistance from Schempp-Hirth. Strictly speaking, it is not a Schempp-Hirth glider but rather a glider built at Schempp-Hirth.

It employed the same fuselage as the Open Class Cirrus and a similar tail, but had an entirely new wing, high-set and in three segments adding up to a  span. The prototype first flew in January 1969.

The type was seriously under-ruddered. After the pilot applied full stick and rudder, the glider continued to fly straight ahead for several seconds before suddenly dropping a wing, requiring full opposite controls. No air brakes were fitted and it was an exceptionally difficult glider to land. It was damaged several times in overshoots.

George Moffat of the USA flew the Nimbus in the 1970 World Gliding Championships at Marfa, Texas. He had to modify the aircraft's cockpit to fit in, and became the first person to sample its spin characteristics when, in mid-competition, the glider departed from a steep turn into autorotation with asymmetric water ballast. While considering bailing out, he remembered that the spin of the similar Akaflieg Darmstadt D36 could be tamed by rocking the stick back and forth violently. Flexing the wings caused the angle of attack to change and recovery eventually ensued. In spite of these difficulties, Moffat and the Nimbus won the World Championship.

The production version of the Nimbus was the Schempp-Hirth Nimbus-2.

Specifications

References

Further reading

1960s German sailplanes
Nimbus
T-tail aircraft
Aircraft first flown in 1969